Ramsauer Ache (in its upper course: Klausbach) is a river of Bavaria, Germany. At its confluence with the Königsseer Ache in Berchtesgaden, the Berchtesgadener Ache is formed.

See also
List of rivers of Bavaria

References

Rivers of Bavaria
Berchtesgadener Land
Berchtesgaden Alps
Rivers of Germany